Sophie Lebrun Dulken (20 July 1781 – 23 July 1863) was a German pianist and composer, the daughter of Munich court oboist Ludwig August Lebrun and singer and composer Francesca Lebrun (Franziska Danzi). Sophie Lebrun was born in London while her mother was on tour. Both she and her sister, the singer and actress Rosine Lebrun, studied singing with their uncle, composer Franz Danzi, and piano with Andreas Streicher.

After completing her studies, Lebrun toured in Europe and became a well-known concert pianist. She married Munich court piano maker J.L. Dülken in 1799 and had children Theobald (b. 1800), who married Louise David the famous pianist, Louise (b. 1805), Fanny (b. 1807)  and Violande (b. 1810), all of whom became musicians. Lebrun composed sonatas and other piano works which were unpublished and became lost. She died in Munich.

References

1781 births
1863 deaths
19th-century classical composers
19th-century classical pianists
19th-century German composers
19th-century women composers
German classical composers
German classical pianists
German music educators
German women classical composers
German women pianists
Women classical pianists
Women music educators
19th-century women pianists